Couillard is a French surname. Notable people with the surname include:

 Philippe Couillard (b. 1957), Quebec politician and provincial premier
 Antoine-Gaspard Couillard (1789-1847), Lower Canada seigneur and politician
 Joseph Louis Eugène Couillard, Canadian diplomat
 Julie Couillard, former girlfriend, and source of controversy and scandal for Canadian federal minister Maxime Bernier

Surnames